Presidential elections were held in Chile on September 4, 1946. The result was a victory for Gabriel González Videla of the Radical Party, who received 40% of the public vote and 75% of the Congressional vote.

Electoral system
The election was held using the absolute majority system, under which a candidate had to receive over 50% of the popular vote to be elected. If no candidate received over 50% of the vote, both houses of the National Congress would come together to vote on the two candidates who received the most votes.

Candidates

Fernando Alessandri
The support of the Democratic Alliance to Gonzalez motivated the separation of a part of the Radical Party, opposite to the communist-radical alliance, which there shaped the Democratic Radical party directed by Julio Durán and Arturo Olavarría. This conglomerate raised Alfredo Duhalde's candidacy, supported also by the Authentic Socialist Party. Then, in one slightly confused situation, Duhalde and Arturo Alessandri stoop his respective candidacies giving step to the candidate Fernando Alessandri Rodríguez, standard-bearer of liberal, radical democratic and authentic Socialists of Marmaduke Grove.

Eduardo Cruz-Coke
The right-wing met in his own convention in July. Conservative, liberal and agrarian Labours Parties members came to the Convention with the following candidates:

Conservatives: Eduardo Cruz-Coke
Agrarian Labour Party: Jaime Larraín 
Liberal: Arturo Alessandri, Jose Maza Fernandez and Francisco Bulnes Correa.

Nevertheless none managed to triumph in the Convention (65% was needed and then 60% of the delegates to be elect) and this one was suspended after one week. Diverse meetings for the only candidate failed, and in this way Eduardo Cruz-Coke's candidacies remained elevated, supported for the conservatives and Arturo Alessandri, for liberal and agrarian Labour Parties members. Then he remained only Cruz-Coke supported by the conservatives, since liberal and agrarian Labours Parties members continued with Fernando Alessandri's candidacy, together with a sector of the radicalism (Democratic Radical party), after the resignations of Arturo Alessandri and the vice-president Alfredo Duhalde.

Gabriel González Videla
Already in February 1946 the situation had been defined inside the Radical party (of the president Ríos) where there face Gabriel Gonzalez Videla and Arturo Olavarría, the latter the support of the "Duhaldist" faction. Nevertheless, before the voting this one sector abstains, leaving only Olavarría, who was widely defeated by his contender.

For your part, the Democratic Alliance, successor of the Popular Front, met in a convention on July 21 and decided to support Gonzalez, leaving of side the candidacy of the communist Elías Lafertte.

Bernardo Ibañez
The Socialist Party of Chile, opposite to such circumstances, there proposes his own candidate, Bernardo Ibáñez Aguila, though in the election are going to give his vote to Gonzalez Videla.

Results

References

Presidential elections in Chile
1946 in Chile
Chile
September 1946 events in South America